The Soma Festival (or sóma, meaning drink of the Gods, see Soma (drink)) is an annual music, arts, and cultural festival. The festival includes concerts, musical performances, well-being activities, art exhibitions and stalls, language events, celebrations of food and drink, music workshops, and pub sessions. The festival began in 2013 and takes place in Castlewellan, County Down in Northern Ireland. The festival is directed by Belfast-born singer Tíona McSherry and run by a team of volunteers. The Festival Club brings together musicians and festival visitors on a nightly basis.

History

2013–2015
The festival was established in 2013 with headline performances from The Olllam, Niamh Parsons and the John McSherry Band. Artists Lorcan Vallely and Barry Kerr exhibited at the festival. Glór Uachtar Tíre's Scoil Samhraidh Shéamuis Uí Néill, an annual Irish language weekend became part of the Soma programme and has been included on an annual basis since. In 2014 the festival received support from Down District Council, Ring of Gullion AONB and the Heritage Lottery Fund enabling them to expand their programme. The festival was headlined by Irish singer Cara Dillon, The Olllam and Balkan Alien Sound.

In 2015, the festival was headlined by singer-songwriter Duke Special. Supported by the newly created Newry, Mourne and Down District Council supercouncil, the festival expanded greatly. Performers included Beoga, Moxie, Karen Matheson, Muireann Nic Amhlaoibh, Pauline Scanlon, John Spillane, John McSherry and Dónal O'Connor and an Irish language music and cabaret hosted by RTÉ Raidió na Gaeltachta presenter Rónán Mac Aodha Bhuí. Uilleann piper John McSherry and composer Colin Harper launched their book, Wheels of the World: 300 Years of Uilleann Pipers and piper Paddy Keenan and singer Mary Dillon were among musicians giving workshops.

2016–present
In 2016 the festival was awarded sponsorship from Tourism Northern Ireland. In that year, the festival featured performances from Lisa Hannigan, Eddi Reader, Dónal Lunny, Flook, Declan O'Rourke and Breaking Trad.

To celebrate NI Year of Food and Drink 2016, the Soma Festival initiated the now-annual Soma Taste Experience, bringing together artisan food and craft beer producers from County Down and around Ireland. Soma Body & Soul became another annual festival feature with well-being professionals offering free and paid activities over two days. The Soma Craft Fair market square was held in Castlewellan's Upper Square, with Soma Kids held in Lower Square. The 2016 Soma Festival was estimated to have attracted 15,000 participants, including more than 200 musicians, artists, well-being practitioners, entertainers and cooks.

The 2017 festival took place from 12 to 16 July of that year.

References

External links
 Soma Festival - official website

Arts festivals in Northern Ireland
Music festivals in Northern Ireland
Tourist attractions in County Down
Tourism in County Down
2013 establishments in Northern Ireland
Traditional music festivals in Ireland
Summer events in Northern Ireland
Music festivals in Ireland